This is a list of the Netherlands national football team results from 1905 to 1919.

Between their first match in 1905 and 1919, the Netherlands played in 45 matches. Throughout this period they played in two Summer Olympics, in 1908 Summer Olympics and in 1912, and the Netherlands won the consolation tournaments of 1908 by walkover (France withdrew in the final) and got Bronze in 1912 after beating Finland 9-0 with 5 goals from Jan Vos.

Results

1900s

1905

1906

1907

1908

1909

1910s

1910

1911

1912

1913

1914

1919

See also
Netherlands national football team results (1905–1919)
Netherlands national football team results (1920–1939)
Netherlands national football team results (1940–1959)
Netherlands national football team results (1960–1979)
Netherlands national football team results (1980–1999)
Netherlands national football team results (2000–2009)
Netherlands national football team results (2010–2019)
Netherlands national football team results (2020–present)

References

External links
Results at RSSSF 

1900s in the Netherlands
1910s in the Netherlands